Roundup is the brand name of a systemic, broad-spectrum glyphosate-based herbicide originally produced by Monsanto, which Bayer acquired in 2018. Glyphosate is the most widely used herbicide in the United States. As of 2009, sales of Roundup herbicides still represented about 10 percent of Monsanto's revenue despite competition from Chinese producers of other glyphosate-based herbicides. The overall Roundup line of products, which includes genetically modified seeds, represented about half of Monsanto's yearly revenue. The product is marketed to consumers by Scotts Miracle-Gro Company.

Monsanto developed and patented the glyphosate molecule in the 1970s, and marketed it as Roundup from 1973. It retained exclusive rights to glyphosate in the US until its US patent expired in September 2000; in other countries the patent expired earlier. The Roundup trademark is registered with the US Patent and Trademark Office and still extant.  However, glyphosate is no longer under patent, so similar products use it as an active ingredient.

The main active ingredient of Roundup is the isopropylamine salt of glyphosate. Another ingredient of Roundup is the surfactant POEA (polyethoxylated tallow amine).

Monsanto also produced seeds which grow into plants genetically engineered to be tolerant to glyphosate, which are known as Roundup Ready crops. The genes contained in these seeds are patented. Such crops allow farmers to use glyphosate as a post-emergence herbicide against most broadleaf and cereal weeds.

Composition
Glyphosate-based formulations may contain a number of adjuvants, the identities of which may be proprietary. Surfactants are used in herbicide formulations as wetting agents, to maximize coverage and aid penetration of the herbicide(s) through plant leaves. As agricultural spray adjuvants, surfactants may be pre-mixed into commercial formulations or they may be purchased separately and mixed on-site.

Polyethoxylated tallow amine (POEA) is a surfactant used in the original Roundup formulation and was commonly used in 2015. Different versions of Roundup have included different percentages of POEA. A 1997 US government report said that Roundup is 15% POEA while Roundup Pro is 14.5%. Since POEA is more toxic to fish and amphibians than glyphosate alone, POEA is not allowed in aquatic formulations.

Acute toxicity
The lethal dose of different glyphosate-based formulations varies, especially with respect to the surfactants used. Formulations intended for terrestrial use that include the surfactant polyethoxylated tallow amine (POEA) can be more toxic than other formulations for aquatic species. Due to the variety in available formulations, including five different glyphosate salts and different combinations of inert ingredients, it is difficult to determine how much surfactants contribute to the overall toxicity of each formulation. Independent scientific reviews and regulatory agencies have regularly concluded that glyphosate-based herbicides do not lead to a significant risk for human or environmental health when the product label is properly followed.

Human
The acute oral toxicity for mammals is low, but death has been reported after deliberate overdose of concentrated Roundup. The surfactants in glyphosate formulations can increase the relative acute toxicity of the formulation. Surfactants generally do not, however, cause synergistic effects (as opposed to additive effects) that increase the acute toxicity of glyphosate within a formulation. The surfactant POEA is not considered an acute toxicity hazard, and has an oral toxicity similar to vitamin A and less toxic than aspirin. Deliberate ingestion of Roundup ranging from 85 to 200 ml (of 41% solution) has resulted in death within hours of ingestion, although it has also been ingested in quantities as large as 500 ml with only mild or moderate symptoms. Consumption of over 85 ml of concentrated product is likely to cause serious symptoms in adults, including burns due to corrosive effects as well as kidney and liver damage. More severe cases lead to "respiratory distress, impaired consciousness, pulmonary edema, infiltration on chest X-ray, shock, arrhythmias, kidney failure requiring haemodialysis, metabolic acidosis, and hyperkalaemia" and death is often preceded by bradycardia and ventricular arrhythmias.

Skin exposure can cause irritation, and photocontact dermatitis has been occasionally reported. Severe skin burns are very rare. In a 2017 risk assessment, the European Chemicals Agency (ECHA) wrote: "There is very limited information on skin irritation in humans. Where skin irritation has been reported, it is unclear whether it is related to glyphosate or co-formulants in glyphosate-containing herbicide formulations." The ECHA concluded that available human data was insufficient to support classification for skin corrosion or irritation.

Inhalation is a minor route of exposure, but spray mist may cause oral or nasal discomfort, an unpleasant taste in the mouth, or tingling and irritation in the throat. Eye exposure may lead to mild conjunctivitis. Superficial corneal injury is possible if irrigation is delayed or inadequate.

Aquatic
Glyphosate formulations with POEA, such as Roundup, are not approved for aquatic use due to aquatic organism toxicity. Due to the presence of POEA, glyphosate formulations only allowed for terrestrial use are more toxic for amphibians and fish than glyphosate alone. Terrestrial glyphosate formulations that include the surfactants POEA and MON 0818 (75% POEA) may have negative impacts on various aquatic organisms like protozoa, mussels, crustaceans, frogs and fish. Aquatic organism exposure risk to terrestrial formulations with POEA is limited to drift or temporary water pockets. While laboratory studies can show effects of glyphosate formulations on aquatic organisms, similar observations rarely occur in the field when instructions on the herbicide label are followed.

Studies in a variety of amphibians have shown the toxicity of products containing POEA to amphibian larvae. These effects include interference with gill morphology and mortality from either the loss of osmotic stability or asphyxiation. At sub-lethal concentrations, exposure to POEA or glyphosate/POEA formulations have been associated with delayed development, accelerated development, reduced size at metamorphosis, developmental malformations of the tail, mouth, eye and head, histological indications of intersex and symptoms of oxidative stress. Glyphosate-based formulations can cause oxidative stress in bullfrog tadpoles. The use of glyphosate-based pesticides are not considered the major cause of amphibian decline, the bulk of which occurred prior to widespread use of glyphosate or in pristine tropical areas with minimal glyphosate exposure.

A 2000 review of the toxicological data on Roundup concluded that "for terrestrial uses of Roundup minimal acute and chronic risk was predicted for potentially exposed nontarget organisms". It also concluded that there were some risks to aquatic organisms exposed to Roundup in shallow water.

Bees
Roundup Ready‐To‐Use, Roundup No Glyphosate, and Roundup ProActive have all been found to cause significant mortality in bumblebees when sprayed directly on them. It has been hypothesized that this is due to surfactants in the formulations blocking the tracheal system of the bees.

Carcinogenicity
There is limited evidence that human cancer risk might increase as a result of occupational exposure to large amounts of glyphosate, such as agricultural work, but no good evidence of such a risk from home use, such as in domestic gardening. The consensus among national pesticide regulatory agencies and scientific organizations is that labeled uses of glyphosate have demonstrated no evidence of human carcinogenicity. Organizations such as the Joint FAO/WHO Meeting on Pesticide Residues and the European Commission, Canadian Pest Management Regulatory Agency, and the German Federal Institute for Risk Assessment have concluded that there is no evidence that glyphosate poses a carcinogenic or genotoxic risk to humans. The final assessment of the Australian Pesticides and Veterinary Medicines Authority in 2017 was that "glyphosate does not pose a carcinogenic risk to humans". The EPA has evaluated the carcinogenic potential of glyphosate multiple times since 1986. In 1986, glyphosate was initially classified as Group C: "Possible Human Carcinogen", but later recommended as Group D: "Not Classifiable as to Human Carcinogenicity" due to lack of statistical significance in previously examined rat tumor studies. In 1991, it was classified as Group E: "Evidence of Non-Carcinogenicity for Humans", and in 2015 and 2017, "Not Likely to be Carcinogenic to Humans".

One international scientific organization, the International Agency for Research on Cancer, classified glyphosate in Group 2A, "probably carcinogenic to humans" in 2015. The variation in classification between this agency and others has been attributed to "use of different data sets" and "methodological differences in the evaluation of the available evidence". In 2017, California environmental regulators listed glyphosate as “known to the state to cause cancer.” The state's Office of Environmental Health Hazard Assessment made the decision based in part on the report from the International Agency for Research on Cancer. State Proposition 65 requires the state office to add all substances the international agency deems carcinogenic to a state list of cancer-causing items.

In a 2003 internal email, a Monsanto toxicologist wrote, "you cannot say that Roundup is not a carcinogen... we have not done the necessary testing on the formulation to make that statement. The testing on the formulations are not anywhere near the level of the active ingredient. We can make that statement about glyphosate and can infer that there is no reason to believe that Roundup would cause cancer." The New York Times published in 2017 that, in a 2003 email also obtained as part of discovery in the court case, a Monsanto scientist wrote to a colleague, "we are in pretty good shape with glyphosate but vulnerable with surfactants. What I've been hearing from you is that this continues to be the case with these studies – Glyphosate is OK but the formulated product (and thus the surfactant) does the damage."

Legal
In the ten months following Bayer's June 2018 acquisition of Monsanto, its stock lost 46% of its value because of investor apprehension concerning the 11,200 lawsuits filed against its subsidiary.  Their company has reached approximately $11 billion settlement with most plaintiffs.

Cancer cases

As of October 30, 2019, there were over 42,000 plaintiffs who said that glyphosate herbicides caused their cancer. After the IARC classified glyphosate as "probably carcinogenic to humans" in 2015, many state and federal lawsuits were filed in the United States.  Early on, over 300 of them were consolidated into a multidistrict litigation called In re: RoundUp Products Liability.

On August 10, 2018, Dewayne Johnson, who has non-Hodgkin's lymphoma, was awarded $289 million in damages (later cut to $78 million on appeal then reduced to $21 million after another appeal) after a jury in San Francisco found that Monsanto had failed to adequately warn consumers of cancer risks posed by the herbicide. Johnson had routinely used two different glyphosate formulations in his work as a groundskeeper, RoundUp and another Monsanto product called Ranger Pro. The jury's verdict addressed the question of whether Monsanto knowingly failed to warn consumers that RoundUp could be harmful, but not whether RoundUp causes cancer. Court documents from the case alleged the company's efforts to influence scientific research via ghostwriting.

In January 2019, Costco decided to stop carrying Roundup or other glyphosate-based herbicides. The decision was reportedly influenced in part by the public court cases.

In March 2019, a man was awarded $80 million (later cut to $26 million on appeal) in a lawsuit claiming Roundup was a substantial factor in his cancer. U.S. District Judge Vince Chhabria stated that a punitive award was appropriate because the evidence "easily supported a conclusion that Monsanto was more concerned with tamping down safety inquiries and manipulating public opinion than it was with ensuring its product is safe."  Chhabria stated that there was evidence on both sides as to whether glyphosate causes cancer, and that the behavior of Monsanto showed "a lack of concern about the risk that its product might be carcinogenic."

On May 13, 2019 a jury in California ordered Bayer to pay a couple $2 billion in damages (later cut to $87 million on appeal) after finding that the company had failed to adequately inform consumers of the possible carcinogenicity of Roundup. On December 19, 2019, it was announced that Timothy Litzenburg, the lawyer for the RoundUp Virginia plaintiffs had been charged with extortion after offering to stop searching for more plaintiffs if he was paid a $200 million consulting fee by a manufacturer of glyphosate. Litzenburg and his partner Daniel Kincheloe pleaded guilty to the charges and they were sentenced to two and one years in prison respectively.

In June 2020, Bayer agreed to settle over a hundred thousand Roundup lawsuits, agreeing to pay $8.8 to $9.6 billion to settle those claims, and $1.5 billion for any future claims. The settlement does not include three cases that have already gone to jury trials and are being appealed.

False advertising
In 1996, Monsanto was accused of false and misleading advertising of glyphosate products, prompting a lawsuit by the New York State attorney general. Monsanto had made claims that its spray-on glyphosate based herbicides, including Roundup, were safer than table salt and "practically non-toxic" to mammals, birds, and fish, "environmentally friendly", and "biodegradable". Citing avoidance of costly litigation, Monsanto settled the case, admitting no wrongdoing, and agreeing to remove the offending advertising claims in New York State.

Environmental and consumer rights campaigners brought a case in France in 2001 accusing Monsanto of presenting Roundup as "biodegradable" and claiming that it "left the soil clean" after use; glyphosate, Roundup's main ingredient, was classed by the European Union as "dangerous for the environment" and "toxic for aquatic organisms". In January 2007, Monsanto was convicted of false advertising and fined 15,000 euros. The result was confirmed in 2009.

On 27 March 2020 Bayer settled claims in a proposed class action alleging that it falsely advertised that the active ingredient in Roundup Weed & Grass Killer only affects plants with a $39.5 million deal that included changing the labels on its products.

Falsification of test results 
Some tests originally conducted on glyphosate by contractors were later found to have been fraudulent, along with tests conducted on other pesticides. Concerns were raised about toxicology tests conducted by Industrial Bio-Test Laboratories in the 1970s and Craven Laboratories was found to have fraudulently analysed samples for residues of glyphosate in 1991. Monsanto has stated that the studies have since been repeated.

Ban in France
In January 2019, Roundup 360 was banned in France following a Lyon court ruling that regulator ANSES had not given due weight to safety concerns when they approved the product in March 2017. The ban went into effect immediately.  The court's decision cited research by the IARC, based in Lyon.

Genetically modified crops

Monsanto first developed Roundup in the 1970s. End-users initially deployed it in a similar way to paraquat and diquat – as a non-selective herbicide. Application of glyphosate-based herbicides to row crops resulted in problems with crop damage and kept them from being widely used for this purpose. In the United States, use of Roundup experienced rapid growth following the commercial introduction of a glyphosate-resistant soybean in 1996. "Roundup Ready" became Monsanto's trademark for its patented line of crop seeds that are resistant to Roundup. Between 1990 and 1996 sales of Roundup increased around 20% per year.  the product was used in over 160 countries.
Roundup is used most heavily on corn, soy, and cotton crops that have been genetically modified to withstand the chemical, but  glyphosate treated approximately 5 million acres in California for crops like almond, peach, cantaloupe, onion, cherry, sweet corn, and citrus, although the product is only applied directly to certain varieties of sweet corn.

See also
 Pesticides in the United States
 Pesticide regulation in the United States
 Environmental impact of pesticides
 Health effects of pesticides
 Integrated pest management
 2,4-Dichlorophenoxyacetic acid

References

Further reading
 Baccara, Mariagiovanna, et al. ”Monsanto's Roundup”,  NYU Stern School of Business: August 2001, Revised July 14, 2003.
 Pease W S et al. (1993) ”Preventing pesticide-related illness in California agriculture: Strategies and priorities”. Environmental Health Policy Program Report. Berkeley, CA: University of California. School of Public Health. California Policy Seminar.
 Wang Y, Jaw C and Chen Y (1994) “Accumulation of 2,4-D and glyphosate in fish and water hyaacinth”. Water Air Soil Pollute. 74:397–403

External links
 
 EPA's Integrated Risk Information System entry for glyphosate the main ingredient in Roundup
 EPA's ground & drinking water consumer factsheet for glyphosate 

Endocrine disruptors
Herbicides
1976 introductions

es:Glifosato
tr:Roundup